Björn Hansen (born 17 February 1967) is a Swedish sailor competing in match racing. He is a five-time winner of the Stena Match Cup Sweden in Marstrand, Sweden. His nickname is Piccolo Urso.

References

Swedish male sailors (sport)
1967 births
Living people
Place of birth missing (living people)
20th-century Swedish people